Andersen Worldwide Société Coopérative (AWSC) was a Swiss-based entity which managed the global offices of accounting firm Arthur Andersen.  It was also the parent corporation of  Andersen Consulting (now called Accenture) before its split in 2000.

This umbrella organization was originally formed under the name of Arthur Andersen Société Coopérative as a Swiss cooperative in 1977 by the then partners of Arthur Andersen LLP and other professional services firms associated with it.  The individual equity partners of Arthur Andersen LLP and the other firms associated with it became the individual members of the SC and the firms themselves became Member Firms by signing a formal agreement with the SC. The SC acted as the coordinator for the provision of common services between the Member Firms (the SC itself had very few employees and provided very few services directly).  The SC never provided any professional services (which were provided in each country by a Member Firm) and did not pay any of its individual members (who were partners in the individual Member Firms and received any remuneration to which they were entitled through their Member Firm).

The key to the cohesion of the Andersen Worldwide Organization lay in the strict provision agreed to by each Member Firm in signing their agreement with the SC and in the individual membership of the SC held by each partner of each Member Firm.  Most partners of individual Andersen practices thought of themselves as partners with every other individual partner worldwide - although legally they were working and being remunerated as partners in their individual Member Firm.  This meant that they acted automatically to achieve the greatest benefit for the worldwide network as a whole - which gave the organization its dynamism and drive.

Following the substantial growth of the consulting services practices of the Member Firms, and the decision taken by the members of the SC to divide the individual national practices of Arthur Andersen into two separate sets of entities - Arthur Andersen and Andersen Consulting - in 1977, pressure primarily from the consulting partners led to an agreed change of name of the SC to Andersen Worldwide Société Coopérative.

In 1997, Andersen Consulting asked to break away from Andersen Worldwide. Three years later, after a long arbitration process under the International Chamber of Commerce, Andersen Consulting finally broke away agreeing to relinquish the use of the name "Andersen" by 1/1/2001.  Sources often mis-reported that Andersen Consulting had to pay $1 billion for its independence.  This is inaccurate.  Andersen Consulting had been paying Arthur Andersen many millions per year, which was at the crux of why Andersen Consulting wanted to break away.  The $1 billion payment at the time of the break-up was not a "payment for independence", rather, it was simply the regular annual payments which were held in escrow until a final arbitration decision was reached.  4 hours after the verdict was official, Arthur Andersen's CEO Jim Wadia promptly resigned.  It was later reported by Wadia that a resolution had been passed by Arthur Andersen's board that Wadia had to get at least $4 billion (over and above the regular annual payments) from Andersen Consulting or step down.

See also 
 Accenture
 Accounting scandals
 Conspiracy of Fools
 Corporate abuse
 Timeline of the Enron scandal
 Arthur Andersen LLP v. United States

External links 

 Arthur Andersen LLP homepage (former Arthur Andersen - Accounting)

Financial services companies of Switzerland